Gematria (or gimatria , plural  or , gimatriot) is the practice of assigning a numerical value to a name, word or phrase according to an alphanumerical cipher. A single word can yield several values depending on the cipher which is used.

Hebrew alphanumeric ciphers were probably used in biblical times, and were later adopted by other cultures. Gematria is still widely used in Jewish culture. Similar systems have been used in other languages and cultures: the Greeks isopsephy, and later, derived from or inspired by Hebrew gematria, Arabic abjad numerals, and English gematria.

Although a type of gematria system ('Aru') was employed by the ancient Babylonian culture, their writing script was logographic, and the numerical assignments they made were to whole words. The value of these words were assigned in an entirely arbitrary manner and correspondences were made through tables, and so cannot be considered a true form of gematria. Aru was very different from the gematria systems used by Hebrew and Greek cultures, which used alphabetic writing scripts. Similar systems have been used in other languages and cultures derived from or inspired by Hebrew gematria; Arabic abjad numerals, and English gematria. There is currently no academic consensus over whether Hebrew gematria or Greek isopsephy was used first.

Gematria sums can involve single words, or a string of lengthy calculations. A well-known short example of Hebrew numerology that uses a gematria cipher is the word  chai ( "alive"), which is composed of two letters that (using the assignments in the Mispar gadol table shown below) add up to 18. This has made 18 a "lucky number" among the Jewish people. Donations of money in multiples of 18 are very popular.

In early Jewish sources, the term "gematria" can also refer to other forms of calculation or letter manipulation, for example atbash.

Etymology
Although the term is Hebrew, it may be derived from the Greek γεωμετρία geōmetriā, "geometry", which was used as a translation of gēmaṭriyā, though some scholars believe it to derive from Greek γραμματεια grammateia "knowledge of writing". It is likely that both Greek words had an influence on the formation of the Hebrew word. Some also hold it to derive from the order of the Greek alphabet, gamma being the third letter of the Greek alphabet ("gamma tria").

The word has been extant in English since at least the 17th century from translations of works by Giovanni Pico della Mirandola. It is largely used in Jewish texts, notably in those associated with the Kabbalah. The term does not appear in the Hebrew Bible itself.

History

The first documented use of gematria is from an Assyrian inscription dating to the 8th century BCE, commissioned by Sargon II. In this inscription, Sargon II states: "the king built the wall of Khorsabad 16,283 cubits long to correspond with the numerical value of his name."

Various scholars have identified gematria on various occasions in the Hebrew Bible.

The Hasmonean king of Judea, Alexander Jannaeus (died 76 BCE) had coins inscribed in Aramaic with the Phoenician alphabet, marking his 20th and 25th year of reign using the letters K and KE (למלכא אלכסנדרוס שנת כ and למלכא אלכסנדרוס שנת כה). It is the oldest known use of Gematria in Hebrew. 

Some old Mishnaic texts may preserve very early usage of this number system, but no surviving written documents exist, and some scholars believe these texts were passed down orally and during the early stages before the Bar Kochba rebellion were never written. Gematria is not known to be found in the Dead Sea scrolls, a vast body of texts from 100 years before and after 0 CE. Neither do any of the documents found from the Bar-Kochba revolt circa 150 CE. 

A sample of graffiti at Pompeii (destroyed under volcanic ash in the year 79 CE) reads "I love the girl whose name is phi mu epsilon (545)". According to Proclus in his commentary on the Timaeus of Plato written in the 5th century, the author Theodorus Asaeus from a century earlier interpreted the word "soul" (ψυχή) based on gematria and an inspection of the graphical aspects of the letters that make up the word. According to Proclus, Theodorus learned these methods from the writings of Numenius of Apamea and Amelius. Proclus rejects these methods by appealing to the arguments against them put forth by the Neoplatonic philosopher Iamblichus. The first argument was that some letters have the same numerical value but opposite meaning. His second argument was that the form of letters changes over the years, and so their graphical qualities cannot hold any deeper meaning. Finally, he puts forth the third argument that when you use all sorts of methods as addition, subtraction, division, multiplication, and even ratios, the sheer infinite ways to combine them will allow you to produce virtually every number for anything you are investigating.

There are at least two cases of gematria appearing in the New Testament. The reference to the miraculous catch of 153 fish in John 21:11 is largely seen as an application of gematria derived from the name of the spring called 'EGLaIM in Ezekiel 47:10. The appearance of this gematria in John 21:11 has been connected to one of the Dead Sea Scrolls, namely 4Q252, which also applies the same gematria of 153 derived from Ezekiel 47 to state that Noah arrived at Mount Ararat on the 153rd day after the beginning of the flood. Some historians see gematria behind the reference to the number of the name of the beast in Revelation as "666", which corresponds to the numerical value of the Hebrew transliteration of the Latin name "Nero Caesar", referring to the 1st century Roman emperor who persecuted the early Christians. Another possible influence on the use of 666 in Revelation goes back to reference to Solomon's intake of 666 talents of gold in 1 Kings 10:14.

Gematria makes several appearances in various Christian and Jewish texts written in the first centuries of the common era. One appearance of gematria in the early Christian period is in the Epistle of Barnabas 9:6–7, which dates to sometime between 70 and 132 CE. There, the 318 servants of Abraham in Genesis 14:14 is used to indicate that Abraham looked forward to the coming of Jesus as the numerical value of some of the letters in the Greek name for Jesus as well as the 't' representing a symbol for the cross also equaled 318. Another example is a Christian interpolation in the Sibylline Oracles, where the symbolic significance of the value of 888 (equal to the numerical value of Iesous, the Latinized rendering of the Greek version of Jesus' name) is asserted. Irenaeus also heavily criticized the interpretation of letters by the Gnostic Marcus. Because of their association with Gnosticism and the criticisms of Irenaeus as well as Hippolytus of Rome and Epiphanius of Salamis, this form of interpretation never became popular in Christianity—though it does appear in at least some texts. Another two examples can be found in 3 Baruch, a text that may have either been composed by a Jew or a Christian sometime between the 1st and 3rd centuries. In the first example, a snake is stated to consume a cubit of ocean every day, but is unable to ever finish consuming it, because the oceans are also refilled by 360 rivers. The number 360 is given because the numerical value of the Greek word for snake, δράκων, when transliterated to Hebrew (דרקון) is 360. In a second example, the number of giants stated to have died during the Deluge is 409,000. The Greek word for 'deluge', κατακλυσμός, has a numerical value of 409 when transliterated in Hebrew characters, thus leading the author of 3 Baruch to use it for the number of perished giants.

Gematria is often used in Rabbinic literature. One example is that the numerical value of  "The Satan" (השטן) in Hebrew is 364, and so it was said that the Satan had authority to prosecute Israel for 364 days before his reign ended on the Day of Atonement, an idea which appears in Yoma 20a and Peskita 7a. Yoma 20a states: "Rami bar Ḥama said: The numerological value of the letters that constitute the word HaSatan is three hundred and sixty four: Heh has a value of five, sin has a value of three hundred, tet has a value of nine, and nun has a value of fifty. Three hundred and sixty-four days of the solar year, which is three hundred and sixty-five days long, Satan has license to prosecute." Genesis 14:14 states that Abraham took 318 of his servants to help him rescue some of his kinsmen, which was taken in Peskita 70b to be a reference to Eleazar, whose name has a numerical value of 318.

The total value of the letters of the Islamic Basmala, i.e. the phrase Bismillah al-Rahman al-Rahim ("In the name of God, the Most Gracious, the Most Merciful"), according to the standard  Abjadi system of numerology, is 786. This number has therefore acquired a significance in folk Islam and Near Eastern folk magic and also appears in many instances of pop-culture, such as its appearance in the 2006 song '786 All is War' by the band Fun^Da^Mental. A recommendation of reciting the basmala 786 times in sequence is recorded in Al-Buni. Sündermann (2006) reports that a contemporary "spiritual healer" from Syria recommends the recitation of the basmala 786 times over a cup of water, which is then to be ingested as medicine.

Still today, the use of gematria is pervasive in many parts of Asia and Africa.

In modern day Israel, Gematria has been used in parodies such as the Baba Bubba a fictional Sephardic rabbi (played by Mony Moshonov during the gulf war of 1991) on the widely popular Zehu Ze! TV show, would calculate how Israel should not be concerned with Iraqi Scud missiles shot at Israel, and how the US and coalition forces would demolish Saddam Hussein's army.

Methods

Standard encoding
In the standard (Mispar hechrechi) version of gematria, each letter is given a numerical value between 1 and 400, as shown in the following table. In the Mispar gadol variation, the five final letters are given their own values, ranging from 500 to 900. It is possible that this well-known cipher was used to conceal other more hidden ciphers in Jewish texts. For instance, a scribe may discuss a sum using the 'standard gematria' cipher, but may intend the sum to be checked with a different secret cipher.

A mathematical formula for finding a letter's corresponding number in Mispar Gadol is: 

 

where x is the position of the letter in the language letters index (regular order of letters), and the floor and modulo functions are used.

Vowels
The value of the Hebrew vowels is not usually counted, but some lesser-known methods include the vowels as well. The most common vowel values are as follows (a less common alternative value, based on the digit sum, is given in parentheses):

Sometimes, the names of the vowels are spelled out and their gematria is calculated using standard methods.

Other methods in Hebrew
There are many different methods used to calculate the numerical value for the individual Hebrew/Aramaic words, phrases or whole sentences. More advanced methods are usually used for the most significant Biblical verses, prayers, names of God, etc. These methods include:
 Mispar Hechrachi (absolute value) is the standard method. It assigns the values 1–9, 10–90, 100–400 to the 22 Hebrew letters in order. Sometimes it is also called Mispar ha-Panim (face number), as opposed to the more complicated Mispar ha-Akhor (back number).
 Mispar Gadol (large value) counts the final forms (sofit) of the Hebrew letters as a continuation of the numerical sequence for the alphabet, with the final letters assigned values from 500 to 900. The name Mispar Gadol is sometimes used for a different method, Otiyot beMilui.
 The same name, Mispar Gadol, is also used for another method, which spells the name of each letter and adds the standard values of the resulting string. For example, the letter Aleph is spelled Aleph-Lamed-Peh, giving it a value of 1+30+80=111.
 Mispar Katan (small value) calculates the value of each letter, but truncates all of the zeros. It is also sometimes called Mispar Me'ugal.
 Mispar Siduri (ordinal value) with each of the 22 letters given a value from 1 to 22.
 Mispar Bone'eh (building value, also Revu'a, square) is calculated by walking over each letter from the beginning to the end, adding the value of all previous letters and the value of the current letter to the running total.
 Mispar Kidmi (preceding value) uses each letter as the sum of all the standard gematria letter values preceding it. Therefore, the value of Aleph is 1, the value of Bet is 1+2=3, the value of Gimel is 1+2+3=6, etc. It's also known as Mispar Meshulash (triangular or tripled number).
 Mispar P'rati calculates the value of each letter as the square of its standard gematria value. Therefore, the value of Aleph is 1 × 1 = 1, the value of Bet is 2 × 2 = 4, the value of Gimel is 3 × 3 = 9, etc. It's also known as Mispar ha-Merubah ha-Prati.
 Mispar ha-Merubah ha-Klali is the square of the standard absolute value of each word.
 Mispar Meshulash calculates the value of each letter as the cube of their standard value. The same term is more often used for Mispar Kidmi.
 Mispar ha-Akhor – The value of each letter is its standard value multiplied by the position of the letter in a word or a phrase in either ascending or descending order. This method is particularly interesting, because the result is sensitive to the order of letters. It is also sometimes called Mispar Meshulash (triangular number).
 Mispar Mispari spells out the standard values of each letter by their Hebrew names ("Achad" (one) is  etc.), and then adds up the standard values of the resulting string.
 Otiyot beMilui ("filled letters", also known as Mispar gadol or Mispar Shemi), uses the value of each letter as equal to the value of its name. Sometimes the same operation is applied two or more times recursively. In a variation known as Otiyot pnimiyot (inner letters), the initial letter in the spelled-out name is omitted, thus the value of Aleph becomes 30+80=110.
 Mispar Ne'elam (hidden number) spells out the name of each letter without the letter itself (e.g., "Leph" for "Aleph") and adds up the value of the resulting string.
 Mispar Katan Mispari (integral reduced value) is used where the total numerical value of a word is reduced to a single digit. If the sum of the value exceeds 9, the integer values of the total are repeatedly added to produce a single-digit number. The same value will be arrived at regardless of whether it is the absolute values, the ordinal values, or the reduced values that are being counted by methods above.
 Mispar Misafi adds the number of the letters in the word or phrase to their gematria.
 Kolel is the number of words, which is often added to the gematria. In case of one word, the standard value is incremented by one.

Related alphabet transformations
Within the wider topic of gematria are included the various alphabet transformations, where one letter is substituted by another based on a logical scheme:
 Atbash exchanges each letter in a word or a phrase by opposite letters. Opposite letters are determined by substituting the first letter of the Hebrew alphabet (Aleph) with the last letter (Tav), the second letter (Bet) with the next to last (Shin), etc. The result can be interpreted as a secret message or calculated by the standard gematria methods. A few instances of Atbash are found already in the Hebrew Bible. For example, see Jeremiah 25:26, and 51:41, with Targum and Rashi, in which the name ששך ("Sheshek") is thought to represent בבל (Babylon).
 Albam – the alphabet is divided in half, eleven letters in each section. The first letter of the first series is exchanged for the first letter of the second series, the second letter of the first series for the second letter of the second series, and so forth.
 Achbi divides the alphabet into two equal groups of 11 letters. Within each group, the first letter is replaced by the last, the second by the 10th, etc.
 Ayak Bakar replaces each letter by another one that has a 10-times-greater value. The final letters usually signify the numbers from 500 to 900. Thousands is reduced to ones (1,000 becomes 1, 2,000 becomes 2, etc.)
 Ofanim replaces each letter by the last letter of its name (e.g. "Fe" for "Aleph").
 Akhas Beta divides the alphabet into three groups of 7, 7 and 8 letters. Each letter is replaced cyclically by the corresponding letter of the next group. The letter Tav remains the same.
 Avgad replaces each letter by the next one. Tav becomes Aleph. The opposite operation is also used.
Most of the above-mentioned methods and ciphers are listed by Rabbi Moshe Cordevero.

Some authors provide lists of as many as 231 various replacement ciphers, related to the 231 mystical Gates of the Sefer Yetzirah.

Dozens of other far more advanced methods are used in Kabbalistic literature, without any particular names. In Ms. Oxford 1,822, one article lists 75 different forms of gematria. Some known methods are recursive in nature and are reminiscent of graph theory or make a lot of use of combinatorics. Rabbi Elazar Rokeach (born c. 1176 – died 1238) often used multiplication, instead of addition, for the above-mentioned methods. For example, spelling out the letters of a word and then multiplying the squares of each letter value in the resulting string produces very large numbers, in orders of trillions. The spelling process can be applied recursively, until a certain pattern (e.g., all the letters of the word "Talmud") is found; the gematria of the resulting string is then calculated. The same author also used the sums of all possible unique letter combinations, which add up to the value of a given letter. Sometimes combinations of repeating letters are not allowed (e.g.,  is valid, but  is not). The original letter itself can also be viewed as a valid combination.

Variant spellings of some letters can be used to produce sets of different numbers, which can be added up or analyzed separately. Many various complex formal systems and recursive algorithms, based on graph-like structural analysis of the letter names and their relations to each other, modular arithmetic, pattern search and other highly advanced techniques, are found in the "Sefer ha-Malchut" by Rabbi David ha-Levi of the Draa Valley, a Spanish-Moroccan Kabbalist of the 15th–16th century. Rabbi David ha-Levi's methods take into consideration the numerical values and other properties of the vowels as well.

Kabbalistic astrology uses some specific methods to determine the astrological influences on a particular person. According to one method, the gematria of the person's name is added to the gematria of his or her mother's name; the result is then divided by 7 and 12. The remainders signify a particular planet and Zodiac sign.

Absolute value
The most common form of Hebrew gematria is used in the Talmud and Midrash, and elaborately by many post-Talmudic commentators. It involves reading words and sentences as numbers, assigning numerical instead of phonetic value to each letter of the Hebrew alphabet. When read as numbers, they can be compared and contrasted with other words or phrases – cf. the Hebrew proverb  (lit. "wine entered, secret went out", i.e. "in vino veritas").

Use in other languages

Greek philosophy
The extant examples of use in Greek come primarily from the Christian literature. Davies and Allison state that, unlike rabbinic sources, isopsephy is always explicitly stated as being used; however, this is a dubious conclusion to make because it relies solely on the pure assumption that there is no hidden isopsephy in Christian literature.

Plato (c. 427–347 BCE) offers a discussion in the Cratylus, involving a view of words and names as referring (more or less accurately) to the "essential nature" of a person or object and that this view may have influenced – and is central to – Greek gematria.

English Gematria

The first numerical cipher that is known to be assigned to the English Alphabet was by Cornelius Agrippa in 1533, in his work De Occulta Philosopha. Agrippa gave value to the English letters without trying to transliterate them from Hebrew or Greek, so L is 20, rather than 30 (for Lamed), M is 30, rather than 40 (for Mem) and N is 40, rather than 50 (for Nun). This cipher is sometimes erroneously labelled as "Jewish" or "Hebrew" by popular numerology calculators, such as Gematrix and Gematrinator.     

The Hermetic Order of the Golden Dawn employed a transliterated version of the Standard Hebrew Cipher (Mispar Hechrechi), using digraphs to represent letters such as shin ש (Sh), tav ת (Th), and tsade צ (Ts or Tz).

Aleister Crowley learned the transliterated English cipher from the Golden Dawn, but he also claimed to be in possession of the "true numerical keys" to the Bible and the Book of the Law which he called "The Key of it All". He never published these keys during his lifetime, but left a numerical riddle (AL II:76) in the Book of the Law and said that his successor would reveal it.

Since the death of Aleister Crowley (1875–1947) a number of people have proposed numerical ciphers for the purposes of numerology with the Book of the Law. The ALW cipher (also known as the New Aeon English Qabalah) was proposed by James Lees in 1976. In 2015, cryptographer Bethsheba Ashe discovered a gematria cipher that worked with both the Bible and the Book of the Law, and encoded the Shematria Gematria Calculator with its values. This cipher is not used for numerology, but for a formal rhetorical system of early mathematics that was used by biblical authors and Aleister Crowley. It has identical values for the regular letters and final letters, and the value of 3 for Shin (ש), and 4 for Tav (ת). When parsed with the formal system of biblical gematria, both the first line of Genesis 1:1 and the Book of the Law, each sum to exactly 700, and the sub-figura number of the Book of the Law is the same as the value of the Hebrew name of the book of Genesis (BraShiTh):

בראשית [220] + אלהים + השמים + הארץ = 700

220 + Had + Manifestation + Nuit = 700.

See also

 About the Mystery of the Letters
 Bible code
 Biblical numerology
 Chronogram
 Hebrew numerals
 Goroawase
 Greek numerals
 Hurufism
 Iconicity
 'Ilm al-Huruf
 Katapayadi system
 Kollel
 Mathers table
 Notarikon
 Numbers in Chinese culture
 Numbers in Egyptian mythology
 Numbers in Norse mythology
 Roman numerals
 Significance of numbers in Judaism
 Temurah (Kabbalah)
 Theomatics
 Untranslatability

Notes

References
 Acres, Kevin, Data integrity patterns of the Torah: A tale of prime, perfect and transcendental numbers, Research Systems, Melbourne, 2004 
 Clawson, Calvin C., Mathematical Mysteries: The Beauty and Magic of Numbers, Perseus Books, 1999
 Davies, William David and Allison, Dale C., A Critical and Exegetical Commentary on the Gospel According to Saint Matthew, Continuum International Publishing Group, 2004
 Davis, John J. Biblical Numerology. Grand Rapids, MI: Baker Books, 1968.
 Hughes, J. P., Suggestive Gematria, Holmes, 2008
 Genesis Rabbah 95:3. Land of Israel, 5th Century. Reprinted in, e.g., Midrash Rabbah: Genesis. Translated by H. Freedman and Maurice Simon. Volume II, London: The Soncino Press, 1983. .
 Deuteronomy Rabbah 1:25. Land of Israel, 5th Century. Reprinted in, e.g., Midrash Rabbah: Leviticus. Translated by H. Freedman and Maurice Simon. Volume VII, London: The Soncino Press, 1983. .
 Klein, Ernest, Dr., A comprehensive etymological dictionary of the English language: Dealing with the origin of words and their sense development thus illustrating the history and civilization of culture, Elsevier, Oxford, 7th ed., 2000
 Lawrence, Shirley Blackwell, The Secret Science of Numerology – The Hidden Meaning of Numbers and Letters, New Page Books, 2001
 Menninger, Karl. Number Words and Number Symbols: A Cultural History of Numbers. Cambridge: MIT Press, 1969.
 Ratzan, Lee, Understanding Information Systems: What They Do and Why We Need Them, ALA Editions, 2004
 Rawn, Jonathan D. Discovering Gematria: Foundational Exegesis and Primary Dictionary. 1,968 pp. Gematria Publishing, 2008.
 Sefer hamilim. Qonqordantzia hakhadash (lekol haTanakh). Lebovits-Kest Memorial, B'nei-Torah Compact Library, Printed in Israel
 Zeitler, William. Musical Gematria. Musica Arcana, 2013, 

Hebrew alphabet
Jewish mysticism
Kabbalah
Kabbalistic words and phrases
Numerology